Isaac Wayne MacVeagh (April 19, 1833January 11, 1917) was an American lawyer, politician and diplomat.  He served as the 36th Attorney General of the United States under the administrations of Presidents James A. Garfield and Chester A. Arthur.

Biography

Early life
MacVeagh was born in Phoenixville, Pennsylvania, on April 19, 1833, the son of Major MacVeagh and Margaret (née Lincoln) McVeagh.  His brother, Franklin MacVeagh, was a Chicago wholesale grocer, banker and U.S. Secretary of the Treasury under President William Howard Taft.

He attended Yale University, where he was a brother of the Delta Kappa Epsilon fraternity (Phi chapter), and graduated tenth in his class in 1853. He was admitted to the bar in 1856, and was the District Attorney of Chester County, Pennsylvania, from 1859 through 1864. During the American Civil War he joined the emergency militia of Pennsylvania that was organized against the threat of Confederate invasion in 1862 and 1863. He raised an independent cavalry company and later served in the 29th Emergency Militia Regiment, reaching the rank of major.

Politician and lawyer
MacVeagh became a leader in the Republican Party, and was a prominent opponent of his father-in-law, Simon Cameron, in the fight within the party in 1871. He was the Ambassador to the Ottoman Empire in 1870 through 1871, and was a member of the state constitutional convention of 1872 and 1873.

In 1875, MacVeagh co-founded the Philadelphia-based law firm known today as Dechert LLP.  He also served as Chairman of the MacVeagh Commission, sent in 1877 by President Rutherford B. Hayes to Louisiana, which secured the settlement of the contest between two existing state governments and thus made possible the withdrawal of U.S. troops from the state.

MacVeagh served as the 36th Attorney General in 1881 under President James A. Garfield. He resigned after President Garfield's assassination. Chester Arthur was to be 21st President and MacVeagh served as a cabinet member.

In 1892, he supported Grover Cleveland, the Democratic nominee for the presidency, and from 1893 to 1897 he served as Ambassador to Italy.  He returned to the Republican Party in 1896. In 1903, he was an chief counsel of the United States before the Hague tribunal in the case regarding the claims of Germany, Britain and Italy against the republic of Venezuela.

After the outbreak of World War I MacVeagh championed the cause of the Allies in an article "The Impossible Chasm", contributed to the North American Review in July 1915. In his last article "Lusitania Day: May 7 1916", for the same magazine, he assailed the slowness of the American government in asserting its rights against Germany.

Personal life
MacVeagh married Letitia Miner Lewis, in 1856.  They had one son, Charles MacVeagh (June 6, 1860December 4, 1931), who became the Ambassador to Japan.

In 1866, after his first wife's death, he married the former Virginia Rolette Cameron, a daughter of U.S. Secretary of War Simon Cameron.

MacVeagh died in Washington, D.C., on January 11, 1917. He was buried at the Church of the Redeemer Cemetery in Bryn Mawr, Pennsylvania.

See also

References

External links

 The MacVeagh Family Papers, including papers, notes, newspaper clippings and correspondence spanning much of Wayne MacVeagh's life, are available for research use at the Historical Society of Pennsylvania.
 

1833 births
1917 deaths
United States Attorneys General
Ambassadors of the United States to the Ottoman Empire
Ambassadors of the United States to Italy
County district attorneys in Pennsylvania
19th-century American diplomats
Union Army officers
Yale University alumni
People from Phoenixville, Pennsylvania
People of Pennsylvania in the American Civil War
Garfield administration cabinet members
Arthur administration cabinet members
Pennsylvania Republicans
Pennsylvania Democrats
19th-century American politicians